Henrietta Cotton Wilson (1847–1915) was the wife of former Governor of West Virginia E. Willis Wilson and served as that state's First Lady, 1885-1890.  She was born in 1847, at Charleston, West Virginia, a daughter of prominent doctor John T. Cotton and Sara Ashton Fitzhugh Cotton. In 1874, she married E. Willis Wilson.  She was the first governor's wife to serve an entire term at Charleston. She died at Charleston in 1915.

References

1847 births
1915 deaths
People from Charleston, West Virginia
First Ladies and Gentlemen of West Virginia